Fabiana Comin  (born 21 March 1970 in Fonte) is an Italian football coach and former footballer who played as a goalkeeper for the Italy women's national football team. She was part of the team at the 1999 FIFA Women's World Cup and UEFA Women's Euro 2001.

References

External links
 
 
 Club stats

1970 births
Living people
Italian women's footballers
Italy women's international footballers
1999 FIFA Women's World Cup players
Women's association football goalkeepers
Serie A (women's football) managers
ACF Milan players
ASD Fiammamonza 1970 players
A.S.D. AGSM Verona F.C. players